This is a list of public art in Ørstedsparken in Copenhagen, Denmark.

List
Source

See also
 List of public art in Rosenborg Castle Gardens
 List of public art in Copenhagen Botanical Garden
 List of public art in Copenhagen

Public art in Copenhagen
Copenhagen-related lists
Ørstedsparken